The Reichsbank ('Bank of the Reich, Bank of the Realm') was the central bank of the German Reich from 1876 until 1945.

History until 1933
The Reichsbank was founded on 1 January 1876, shortly after the establishment of the German Empire in 1871. It was the central bank of Prussia, under the close control of the Reich government. Its first president was Hermann von Dechend. Before unification in 1871, Germany had 31 central banks – the Notenbanken ("note banks"). Each of the independent states issued their own money. In 1870, a law was passed that forbade the formation of further central banks. In 1874, a draft banking law was introduced in the Reichstag, the federal legislature of the German Reich. After several changes and compromises, the law was passed in 1875. Despite the creation of the Reichsbank, however, four of the Notenbanken – Baden, Bavaria, Saxony and Württemberg – continued to exist until 1914 .

The Reichsbank experienced both stable and volatile periods. Until World War I, the Reichsbank produced a very stable currency called the Goldmark, but at the outbreak of WWI the link between the mark and gold was abandoned, resulting in the Papiermark. The expenses of the war caused inflationary pressure and the mark started to decrease in value . The defeat of Imperial Germany in 1918, the economic burden caused by the payment of war reparations to the Allies, and the social unrest in the early years culminated in the German hyperinflation of 1922–23.

Economic reforms, such as the issue of a new provisional currency – the Rentenmark – and the 1924 Dawes Plan, stabilised German monetary development and thus the economic outlook of the Weimar Republic. One of the key reforms caused by the Dawes Plan was the establishment of the Reichsbank as an institution independent of the Reich government. On 30 August 1924, the Reichsbank began issuing the Reichsmark, which served as the German currency until 1948.

Nazi period

The seizure and consolidation of power by the Nazis during the years of the Third Reich also greatly affected the Reichsbank.  A 1937 law re-established the Reich Government's control of the Reichsbank, and in 1939, the Reichsbank was renamed the Deutsche Reichsbank (“Bank of the German Reich”, lit.: “Bank of the German Realm”) and placed under the direct control of Adolf Hitler, with Walther Funk as the last president of the Reichsbank, from 1939 to 1945. The bank benefited by the theft of the property of numerous governments invaded by the Germans, especially their gold reserves and much personal property of the Third Reich's many victims, especially the Jews. Personal possessions such as gold wedding rings were confiscated from prisoners, and gold teeth torn from dead bodies, and after cleaning, were deposited in the bank under the false-name Max Heiliger accounts, and melted down as bullion. The defeat of Nazi Germany in May 1945 also resulted in the dissolution of the Reichsbank, along with other Reich ministries and institutions. The explanation of the disappearance of the Reichsbank reserves in 1945 was uncovered by Bill Stanley Moss and Andrew Kennedy, in post-war Germany.  In April and May 1945, the remaining reserves of the Reichsbank – gold (730 bars), cash (6 large sacks), and precious stones and metals such as platinum (25 sealed boxes) – were dispatched by Walther Funk to be buried on the Klausenhof Mountain at Einsiedl in Bavaria, where the final German resistance was to be concentrated. Similarly, the Abwehr cash reserves were hidden nearby in Garmisch-Partenkirchen. Shortly after the American forces overran the area, the reserves and money disappeared.
Funk would be tried and convicted of war crimes at the Nuremberg trials, not least for receiving money and goods stolen from Jewish and other victims of the Nazi concentration camps. Gold teeth extracted from the mouths of victims were found in 1945 in the vaults of the bank in Berlin.

The Allied occupation authorities (in the West – Great Britain, France and the United States; in the East – the Soviet Union) became responsible for German monetary policy in the immediate postwar years.  In this role, the Allies continued to issue Reichsmarks (and Allied military marks) as the German banking system was gradually restored.  In 1948, the Reichsmark ceased to exist owing to the introduction of the Deutsche Mark in the West and the East German mark in the East.  In West Germany, monetary policy was taken over by the Bank deutscher Länder (Bank of the German States) and later by the Deutsche Bundesbank. In East Germany, this role was assumed by the Deutsche Notenbank (later renamed as the Staatsbank der DDR (State Bank of the German Democratic Republic).

Reichsbank presidents

References

External links

 
 

Banks of Germany
Banks established in 1876
1945 disestablishments in Germany
Economy of the German Empire
Former central banks
Economy of Nazi Germany
German companies established in 1876